Charles Bernard Alfred Bignell (12 May 1917 – 19 June 1967) was an Australian rules footballer who played for the Carlton Football Club in the Victorian Football League (VFL).

Family
He married Gwendoline Phyllis Allan in 1942.

Military service
He enlisted in the Second AIF in August 1940.

Death
He died at his home in Kew, Victoria on 19 June 1967.

Notes

References
 
 World War Two Service Record: Bernard Alfred Charles Bignell (V61112), Department of Veteran's Affairs.

External links 

Bernie Bignell's profile at Blueseum

1917 births
1967 deaths
VFL/AFL players born outside Australia
Carlton Football Club players
Australian rules footballers from Victoria (Australia)
English emigrants to Australia
Australian Army personnel of World War II